Cascade River State Park is a state park near the northeastern tip of Minnesota, USA. The park is in a rocky and rugged location where the Cascade River descends to meet Lake Superior. It has many different types of wildlife including various birds and mammals.

Cascade River State Park is also connected to the Superior Hiking Trail.

The site was originally named Cascade River State Wayside.  It was developed by the Civilian Conservation Corps starting around July 1934.  One of the projects was a huge  overlook wall, built from locally quarried gabbro.  The roadside development plans were drawn by Arthur R. Nichols and Harold E. Olson.  The project was considered a model for roadside development.  The development work was supervised and inspected not just by National Park Service employees, but also by members of the Minnesota Highway Department, staff of the Minneapolis Park Board, Civilian Conservation Corps individuals, members of the Minnesota Legislature, and some Canadian officials.  The wayside was listed on the National Register of Historic Places on August 4, 2003.

Gallery

References

External links

 Cascade River State Park

1957 establishments in Minnesota
Park buildings and structures on the National Register of Historic Places in Minnesota
Protected areas established in 1957
Protected areas of Cook County, Minnesota
State parks of Minnesota
National Register of Historic Places in Cook County, Minnesota
Arthur R. Nichols works
Civilian Conservation Corps in Minnesota
Roadside parks